Dušan Milošević (born 15 April 1990) is a Serbian professional basketball player for Proleter Naftagas of the Second League of Serbia.

Professional career 
A guard, Milošević played for Crvena zvezda, Ulcinj, Teodo Tivat, Crnokosa, Tamiš, OKK Beograd, and Radnički Beograd.

References

External links

 Dusan Milosevic at eurobasket.com
 Dusan Milosevic at realgm.com
 Dusan Milosevic at proballers.com
 Dusan Milosevic at aba-liga.com
 Dusan Milosevic at euroleague.net

1991 births
Living people
ABA League players
Basketball League of Serbia players
BKK Radnički players
KK Crvena zvezda players
KK Crnokosa players
KK Proleter Zrenjanin players
KK Tamiš players
KK Teodo Tivat players
OKK Beograd players
People from Prokuplje
Point guards
Serbian expatriate basketball people in Montenegro
Serbian men's basketball players
Shooting guards